Bicyclus persimilis is a butterfly in the family Nymphalidae. It is found in the border region of the Democratic Republic of the Congo and Uganda, as well as in Rwanda and Burundi.

References

Elymniini
Butterflies described in 1921